Edgar "Eddie" Holmes (20 April 1862 – death unknown) was an English rugby union footballer who played in the 1890s, and rugby union referee. He played at representative level for England, and Yorkshire, and at club level for Manningham FC, as a forward, e.g. front row, lock, or back row. Prior to Tuesday 27 August 1895, Manningham was a rugby union club, it then became a rugby league club, and since Friday 29 May 1903 it has been the association football (soccer) club Bradford City.

Background
Edgar Holmes was born in Girlington, Bradford, West Riding of Yorkshire.

Playing career

International honours
Edgar Holmes won caps for England while at Manningham in 1890 against Scotland, and Ireland.

Change of Code
When Manningham converted from the rugby union code to the rugby league code on Tuesday 27 August 1895, Edgar Holmes would have been approximately 32. Consequently, he may have been both a rugby union and rugby league footballer for Manningham.

References

External links
Search for "Holmes" at rugbyleagueproject.org
Search for "Edgar Holmes" at britishnewspaperarchive.co.uk
Search for "Eddie Holmes" at britishnewspaperarchive.co.uk

1862 births
England international rugby union players
English rugby union players
English rugby union referees
Manningham F.C. players
Place of birth missing
Place of death missing
Rugby union forwards
Rugby union players from Bradford
Year of death missing
Yorkshire County RFU players